Escherichia albertii is a species of bacterium in the same genus as E. coli. It was described in 2003 after being isolated from the diarrhea of Bangladeshi children. Five strains are known. The importance of the species in disease is unclear.

References

External links
Type strain of Escherichia albertii at BacDive – the Bacterial Diversity Metadatabase

albertii
Bacteria described in 2003